Mohd Sharkar bin Shamsudin (born 25 July 1962) is a Malaysian politician who has served as Speaker of the Pahang State Legislative Assembly since December 2022. He served as Member of the Pahang State Executive Council (EXCO) in the Barisan Nasional (BN) state administration under Menteris Besar Adnan Yaakob and Wan Rosdy Wan Ismail from April 2004 to November 2022 and Member of the Pahang State Legislative Assembly (MLA) for Lanchang from November 1999 to November 2022. He is also a member  of the United Malays National Organisation (UMNO), a component party of the BN coalition. He is also a member of the Supreme Council of UMNO.

Political career
He firstly contested and won the Lanchang state seat in the 1999 Pahang state election. He was reelected as the Lanchang MLA for four times in the 2004, 2008, 2013 and 2018 Pahang state elections.  He also contested for Temerloh federal seat in the 2018 general election and lost. He was transferred from the Lanchang state seat to contest for the Temerloh seat in 2022 general election and lost again.

Mohd Sharkar has held various party positions of UMNO at different levels :
(Earlier days)
 UMNO Club of California Deputy Chairman (1989-1991)
 UMNO Youth Mentakab Division Deputy Chief (1993-1995)
 UMNO Mentakab Division Chief Information (1993-1995)
 UMNO Youth Malaysia Secretary Executive (1993-1996)
 UMNO Youth Mentakab Division Chief (1995-2001)
 UMNO Youth Pahang Chief Information (1998-2000)
 UMNO Temerloh/Mentakab Division Deputy Chief (2001-2008)
 UMNO Temerloh Division Chief (2008–present)
 UMNO Pahang Chief Information (2000-2009)
 UMNO Pahang Deputy Chairman (2009-2018)
 UMNO Supreme Council (2013–present)

Education
He was born and raised in Temerloh, Mohd Sharkar completed his secondary in Technical Institute Kuantan in 1979. He continued his Form Six at Yayasan Anda Akademik before he furthered his study in the USA. He graduated from Indiana State University, Terre Haute, Indiana, where he received a Bachelor's Science Degree in Business Administration in 1986. In June 2013, he was appointed as Chairman of Pahang State Tourism and Culture Committee.

Personal life
Mohd Sharkar is married to Mustakizah Sulaiman and has four children.

Election results

Honours
  :
  Knight Companion of the Order of the Crown of Pahang (DIMP) – Dato' (2004)
  Knight Companion of the Order of Sultan Ahmad Shah of Pahang (DSAP) - Dato' (2007)
 Grand Knight of the Order of the Crown of Pahang (SIMP) - Dato' Indera (2012)
  Grand Knight of the Order of Sultan Ahmad Shah of Pahang (SSAP) – Dato' Sri (2014)

References

 State Government of Pahang, Malaysia

1962 births
Living people
People from Pahang
Malaysian people of Malay descent
Malaysian Muslims
United Malays National Organisation politicians
Members of the Pahang State Legislative Assembly
Pahang state executive councillors